Mark John Sheeran (born 9 September 1982) is an English former professional football striker who played 32 league games scoring 6 times in three years for Darlington between of 2001 and 2004.

References

External links

Previous club Spennymoor Town in the Northern League, 
Season 2011-12 playing for Red House Farm FC in the Northern Football Alliance Division Two

1982 births
Living people
Footballers from Newcastle upon Tyne
English footballers
Darlington F.C. players
English Football League players
Association football forwards